Gustav Lohse (22 May 1911 – 16 March 1999) was a German film editor.

Selected filmography
 Love at First Sight (1932)
 Viennese Waltz (1932)
 The Hymn of Leuthen (1933)
 Ripening Youth (1933)
 Trouble with Jolanthe (1934)
 Sergeant Schwenke  (1935)
 I Was Jack Mortimer (1935)
 The Private Life of Louis XIV (1935)
 When the Cock Crows (1936)
 The Dreamer (1936)
 If We All Were Angels (1936)
 Such Great Foolishness (1937)
 The Model Husband (1937)
 The Four Companions (1938)
 The Roundabouts of Handsome Karl (1938)
 The Life and Loves of Tschaikovsky (1939)
 The Gasman (1941)
 Wedding in Barenhof (1942)
 Three Girls Spinning (1950)

References

Bibliography
 Michelle Langford. Directory of World Cinema: Germany. Intellect Books, 2012.

External links

1911 births
1999 deaths
German film editors
Film people from Berlin